Smith-Nelson Hotel, and also known as the Nelson Hotel and to locals as The Painted Lady, is a historic hotel in Reidsville, Georgia, in Tattnall County. The address of the hotel is 118 South Main Street.  It is a two-story building built in 1908 and is considered Folk Victorian in architectural style.  It has a hipped roof with center gables and a wrap-around porch.  Tongue-and-groove paneling is used throughout the inside.  Each floor has a central hallway with two rooms on each side.  A one-story kitchen ell was added in the 1950s.  As of February 2018, the building is for sale.

It was added to the National Register of Historic Places on March 29, 2001.

See also
National Register of Historic Places listings in Tattnall County, Georgia

References

External links
Photograph of the building's exterior
 

Hotel buildings on the National Register of Historic Places in Georgia (U.S. state)
Victorian architecture in Georgia (U.S. state)
Buildings and structures in Tattnall County, Georgia
Hotel buildings completed in 1908
National Register of Historic Places in Tattnall County, Georgia
1908 establishments in Georgia (U.S. state)